WDLS (900 AM) is a radio station in the resort community of Wisconsin Dells, Wisconsin.

History
The station was founded in 1969 by Obed S. Borgen and originally went on the air as WWDA on 990 kHz (the call sign stood for "Wonderful Wisconsin Dells Area"). An FM sister station, at 107.1 FM, was added four years later, with John Taylor as the general manager. Taylor Electric Company acquired WWDA and the FM station, WQRH) and relaunched the station as WNNO-AM-FM, call letters the AM station would use from the 1970s (during which time it was a Mutual Broadcasting System affiliate) into the 1990s.

The station was sold to Voss Radio, Inc. in 1978, and it continued to simulcast Top 40 music. WNNO-AM-FM split its simulcast and programmed Country Hits in 1982, and broadcast Chicago Cubs baseball from 1983-1985. It was during this time period that the frequency moved from the original AM 990 to the current AM 900 dial position.

Voss sold the station in 1985 to Armada Broadcasting.  At this time, WNNO AM returned to simulcasting Top 40 hits with WNNO-FM.  One of the principal owners of Armada Broadcasting is the nephew of radio legend Gary Owens, and Gary's liners for WNNO could be heard on the station during this time period.

During the early-mid 90s its format alternated between sports and a simulcast of sister Top-40 station WNNO-FM (106.9), or was otherwise off the air, usually after sunset. WNNO and WNNO-FM had studios together on Superior Street in Wisconsin Dells and would usually be on the air from 6 a.m. to midnight.

In the late 1990s WNNO-AM-FM were purchased by Magnum Radio Group; the studios were moved to Church Street, Wisconsin Dells. By that time, WNNO-AM had become WDLS, and simulcast WIBU-AM (1240) Poynette, which aired Jones Radio Networks' Classic Hit Country format at the time. WNNO-FM became Jones Hot AC under the name "Mix 106".

By 2000, WIBU and WDLS had become adult standards simulcasting Jones' Music of Your Life format. WIBU was later sold off and WDLS became WIBU while continuing to air the adult standards format.

In September 2007, the station returned to Classic Country, initially running programming from Westwood One before dropping Westwood One programming by 2015.

Tourist Format

The station was the first in the industry to introduce a "visitor information" format since the format signed on during the Memorial Day weekend of 2004. Its approach emphasized tips and suggestions to help visitors make the best of their vacation time in the popular resort region, even to the point of actually encouraging visitors to come into the studios on Broadway in Downtown Wisconsin Dells and relate their experiences. The station's musical playlist was broad, extending to oldies, 1970s and 1980s hits, country standards and soft hits. Since its audio stream went online in Spring 2005, it became the #1 online radio station in the world of its type. In September 2007, the station returned to its original format of classic country.

In March 2005, the online audio stream of WDLS-AM, as powered by Warp Radio, went live on its website to further increase its potential audience across the Internet.

Within weeks of its launch, its audio stream became the #1 online streaming radio station for its genre, attracting listeners (and subsequent e-mail inquiries about the Wisconsin Dells area) from around the world.

In December 2006, hosting for the online stream was moved to Surfer Network.

See More
WNNO-FM, WDLS's sister station

External links

The former WDLS audio stream

DLS
Classic country radio stations in the United States
Wisconsin Dells, Wisconsin